
This article is a chronological list of United States criminal case law articles on Wikipedia that discuss the Fourth Amendment constitutional provision against unreasonable search and seizure in its relation to consent to search.

Warren Court (1953–1968) 
 Stoner v. California (1964) - motel employees cannot give consent
 Katz v. United States (1967) - telephone booth has reasonable expectation of privacy

Burger Court (1969–1986) 
 Frazier v. Cupp (1969) - one person can give consent in case of joint custody
 Schneckloth v. Bustamonte (1973) - government must show that consent occurred
 United States v. Watson (1976) - valid consent from person under arrest
 United States v. Mendenhall (1980) - consent stop converted to Terry stop
 South Dakota v. Neville (1983) - refusal to DUI test can be used as proof of guilt
 Florida v. Royer (1983) - consent obtained during unlawful detention is invalid

Rehnquist Court (1986–2005) 
 Illinois v. Rodriguez (1990) - search valid if police reasonably believe consent given by owner
 Florida v. Bostick (1991) - not "free to leave" but "free to decline" on bus
 Florida v. Jimeno (1991) - can request officer to limit scope of search
 Ohio v. Robinette (1996) - do not have to inform motorist is free to go
 United States v. Drayton (2002) - police do not have to advise you of rights before search

Roberts Court (2005–present) 
 Georgia v. Randolph (2006) - cannot search house if one resident agrees but another resident objects

External links
Library of Congress - U.S. Reports - Supreme Court decisions:

Criminal law, search, consent, case law
Search, consent, case law